Marvin Yanis Kokos (born 12 October 2000) is a French professional footballer who plays as a winger.

Professional career
A youth product of Olympique de Marseille, Kokos joined FC Martigues in 2017, before signing with Gazélec Ajaccio in 2018. He made his professional debut with Gazélec Ajaccio in a 1–1 Ligue 2 tie with Le Havre AC on 14 December 2018, and scored his side's only goal in his debut.

Oldham Athletic 
On 22 July 2019, Kokos joined League Two side Oldham Athletic on a two-year deal with an option for a third, following a successful trial period. However, he was released at the end of the 2019-20 season, after playing only 16 minutes in the EFL Trophy.

References

External links
 
 
 OM Profile

2000 births
Living people
Footballers from Marseille
French footballers
French expatriate footballers
Olympique de Marseille players
FC Martigues players
Gazélec Ajaccio players
Oldham Athletic A.F.C. players
Ligue 2 players
Championnat National 3 players
Association football wingers
French expatriate sportspeople in England
Expatriate footballers in England